Grey Poupon is a brand of Dijon mustard which originated in Dijon, France.

The U.S. rights to the brand were acquired by the Heublein Company, later passing on to Kraft Foods. Grey Poupon became popular in the United States in the late 1970s and 1980s as American tastes broadened from conventional American yellow mustards, aided in large part by a memorable advertising campaign emphasizing the product's association with luxury.

Like other Dijon mustards, Grey Poupon contains a small amount of white wine. The American version is made with brown mustard seed grown in Canada.

History

Maurice Grey (b. Urcy, France, 1816; d. 1897), who was winning medals for his Dijon mustard machine in 1855, in 1860 was awarded a Royal Appointment for developing a machine that dramatically increased the speed of production of mustard. However, needing financing, which he obtained in 1866 from Auguste Poupon, another Dijon mustard manufacturer, the Grey–Poupon partnership produced their first mustard around 1866 in Dijon, France.

In 1946, the Heublein Company bought the American rights from the original company.

In 1970, the directors of Grey Poupon and of another Dijon mustard firm, André Ricard, having earlier bought the popular Maille-label, formed a conglomerate called S.E.G.M.A. Maille. Soon afterwards, the new company decided to phase out the Grey Poupon label in France.

In America, R. J. Reynolds Tobacco Company acquired Heublein in 1982 and merged it with Nabisco in 1985 to form RJR Nabisco. In 1999, Kraft Foods acquired Nabisco, including the Grey Poupon brand.

In 2000, Amora-Maille was acquired by Unilever and UK trademark rights to Grey Poupon were assumed by it until 2005 when the rights were sold to G Costa & Company Limited, a subsidiary of Associated British Foods. In 2008, Associated British Foods folded G Costa into AB World Foods.

Grey Poupon Dijon and wholegrain mustard are still produced in France for the European markets. Production of Grey Poupon for the American market moved to Holland, Michigan, from Pennsylvania following Kraft Heinz's expansion of its 120-year-old Holland production facility.

Marketing

Advertising
Heublein increased the visibility and name recognition of their mustard brand with a 1980s commercial pointing out that "one can enjoy the finer things of life with white wine mustard without paying high prices", in which a Rolls-Royce pulls up alongside another Rolls-Royce, and a passenger in one asks "Pardon me, would you have any Grey Poupon?" The other responds, "But of course!" The closing shot is of the Grey Poupon jar being passed between the vehicles. In one variation, the characters are on the Orient Express.

The commercial spawned a number of variations, often comedic; a 1991 version features Ian Richardson asking Paul Eddington if he has any Grey Poupon, to which Eddington replies, "But of course", then motions for his driver to speed away. It is implied that they are playing the roles of the fictitious British Prime Ministers Francis Urquhart (from House of Cards) and Jim Hacker (from Yes, Prime Minister), respectively. Another commercial included the introduction of a plastic squeeze bottle, wherein the bottle makes a flatulent noise, much to the mortification of the driver.

The advertising campaign helped solidify Grey Poupon's status as a product associated with the wealthy; in 1992, Grey Poupon had the strongest correlation between a person's income and whether or not they used the product.

In 2013, Grey Poupon created a new advertisement, playing upon the 1980s commercial, displaying a duel between the driver who took the Grey Poupon jar (played by British actor Frazer Douglas) being chased down by the mustard's original owner (played by American actor Rod McCary). The spot was nominated for an Emmy for best commercial.

Brand extensions
In 2007, Kraft introduced three new specialty mustards under the Grey Poupon brand: a coarse-ground mustard with whole mustard seeds, a spicy brown mustard with diced yellow onions, and a honey mustard with clover honey and spices. Only the coarse ground version remains in production.

In popular culture
The "Pardon me, would you have any Grey Poupon?" commercials have been parodied in many films and TV shows, including Wayne's World (1992), Married... with Childrens "Old Insurance Dodge", WWE SmackDown and Family Guy's "Blue Harvest" (September 23, 2007). The question was asked by Michael J. Fox's character, while preparing to eat a frog dog in the film The Hard Way (1991), by Little Richard in The Naked Truth, and by the Dutch character (Joost Michael de Witt) in Emilio Estevez's film The Way (2010). The line was also mentioned in a deleted scene from The Office, said by character Andy Bernard.

In her semi-autobiographical 1983 novel Heartburn, Nora Ephron's protagonist describes the recipe for an ideal vinaigrette as "mix two tablespoons of Grey Poupon mustard with two tablespoons good redwine vinegar. Then, whisking constantly with a fork, slowly add six tablespoons olive oil, until the vinaigrette is thick and creamy; this makes a very strong vinaigrette that is perfect for salad greens like arugula and watercress and endive."

The Grey Poupon name has appeared frequently in hip-hop and rap lyrics since 1992, when Das EFX mentioned the brand on their song "East Coast". Artists such as MF DOOM, Kanye West, Big Sean, Jay Z, Kendrick Lamar, and T-Pain have all referenced Grey Poupon in their song lyrics. According to rapper Open Mike Eagle, the prevalence of these references is attributable to how convenient it is to create a rhyme with the brand name as well as how strongly the product is associated with class, style, and luxury.

See also

 List of mustard brands
 List of brand name condiments
 Maille Dijon mustard

References

External links
 
 Malcolm Gladwell article describing the brand's rise in the U.S.A.

Brand name condiments
Mustard brands
Kraft Foods brands
1866 introductions